is a passenger railway station located in the southern part of the town of Yamakita, Kanagawa, Japan, operated by Central Japan Railway Company (JR Central). Initially primarily a freight station, used to transport firewood and charcoal from the Tanzawa Mountains, Yaga Station now serves only passenger traffic to nearby Lake Tanzawa and the Nakagawa onsen resorts.

Lines
Yaga Station is served by the Gotemba Line and is 20.0 kilometers from the terminus of the line at Kōzu Station

Station layout 
Yaga Station is an unattended station with two opposed ground side platforms.

History 
Yaga Station was established on March 15, 1907, as the Yaga Signal Stop of the Japanese Government Railways (JGR), the predecessor to the Japanese National Railways (JNR), when the line from Yamakita to Suruga-Oyama was completed. It was upgraded to a full station on July 15, 1947. The line was electrified in 1968, and freight operations discontinued from 1971. With the privatization of JNR on April 1, 1987, it came under the operational control of the Central Japan Railway Company. Express train service was discontinued from 1991. A new station building was completed in March 2000.

Station numbering was introduced to the Gotemba Line in March 2018; Yaga Station was assigned station number CB07.

Passenger statistics
In fiscal 2018, the station was used by an average of 104 passengers daily (boarding passengers only).

The passenger figures (boarding passengers only) for previous years are as shown below.

Bus services 
 Fujikyu Shonan Bus 
 for Nishi Tanzawa via Lake Tanzawa and Nakagawa Onsen
 for Shin-Matsuda Station (Odakyu Odawara Line) via Yamakita Station (JR Central)

Surrounding area
National Route 246

See also
List of railway stations in Japan

References

External links

 Station information (Gotembasen.net) 

Railway stations in Kanagawa Prefecture
Railway stations in Japan opened in 1947
Yamakita, Kanagawa